Annette Wademant (1928–2017) was a Belgian screenwriter active in the French film industry. She was married to the director Michel Boisrond.

Selected filmography
 Edward and Caroline (1951)
 Casque d'Or (1952)
 Rue de l'Estrapade (1953)
 The Earrings of Madame de… (1953)
 Lola Montès (1955)
 Maid in Paris (1956)
 Women's Club (1956)
 A Kiss for a Killer (1957)
 Typhoon Over Nagasaki (1957)
 La Parisienne (1957)
 Come Dance with Me (1959)
 Women Are Weak (1959)
 Love and the Frenchwoman (1960)
 How to Succeed in Love (1962)
 Tales of Paris (1962)
 Cherchez l'idole (1964)
 How Do You Like My Sister? (1964)
 The Private Lesson (1968)
 Du soleil plein les yeux (1970)
 Dis-moi que tu m'aimes (1974)
 L'enfant secret (1979)

References

Bibliography
 Gillain, Anne. Truffaut on Cinema. Indiana University Press, 2017.

External links

1928 births
2017 deaths
Belgian emigrants to France
Belgian screenwriters
People from  Brussels
Belgian women screenwriters